Niña de Fuego is the third studio album by Spanish singer Concha Buika. It was nominated for the Latin Grammy Award for Album of the Year. The record was released on January 2, 2008 via Casa Limón and DRO Atlantic labels.

Overview
La Nina de Fuego is a collection of flamenco songs and also Spanish and Mexican folk ballads. The texts are about women facing loneliness, infidelity, and falling in love with the wrong man.

Buika's singing is accompanied by Javier Limón's guitar and the piano playing of Ivan Lewis.

Track listing

Personnel
Manolo Caracol – composer  
Óscar Clavel – mixing  
Horacio "El Negro" Hernández – bateria, drum  
Ivan "Melon" Lewis – piano 
 "Dizzy" Daniel Moorehead – saxophone (track 3)
Javier Limón – arranger, dirigida, flamenco guitar, liner notes 
Salomé Limón – executive producer, recording  
Juan Mostazo – composer  
Melisa Nanni – recording  
Ramón Porrina – percussion  
Carlitos Sarduy – trumpet  
Alan Silverman – mastering  
David Trueba – composer

Review

—All About Jazz

References

External links 
Buika's Official Site

2008 albums
Albums produced by Javier Limón
Concha Buika albums
Spanish-language albums